Seeland is a town in the Salzlandkreis district, in Saxony-Anhalt, Germany. It is situated northwest of Aschersleben. It was formed by the merger of the previously independent municipalities Friedrichsaue, Frose, Hoym, Nachterstedt and Schadeleben on 15 July 2009. Before this date, these municipalities cooperated in the Verwaltungsgemeinschaft ("collective municipality") Seeland, which also contained the municipality Gatersleben. Gatersleben joined Seeland in September 2010.

References

Former Verwaltungsgemeinschaften in Saxony-Anhalt
 
Salzlandkreis